The Embassy of Montenegro in Washington, D.C. is the diplomatic mission of Montenegro to the United States. The embassy is located at 1610 New Hampshire Avenue, Northwest, Washington, D.C. The embassy is also accredited on a non-resident basis to Canada and Mexico.

The current Ambassador of Montenegro to the United States is Mr. Nebojša Kaluđerović.

There is one Consulate General in New York City (Consul General Branko Milić).

Montenegro's Permanent Mission to the United Nations in New York is led by Ambassador Željko Perović.

See also
 Montenegrin diplomatic missions
 Montenegro – United States relations
 Foreign relations of Montenegro
 List of Washington, D.C. embassies

References

External links

Official website

Washington, D.C.
Montenegro
Montenegro–United States relations
Dupont Circle